John Corbet may refer to:

John Corbet, 3rd Baron Corbet (died 1347), last member of the Barons Corbet on the list of peers 1340–1349
John Corbet (by 1500–55 or later), MP for Shropshire
John Corbet (died 1559), MP for Norwich
John Corbet, various Corbet baronets, including:
Sir John Corbet, 1st Baronet, of Sprowston (1591–1628), MP for Norfolk and Yarmouth
Sir John Corbet, 1st Baronet, of Stoke upon Tern (1594–1662), MP for Shropshire
John Corbet (theologian) (1603–1641), Scottish minister of Bonhill and anti-presbyterian author
John Corbet (Puritan) (1620–1680), Puritan author, see Richard Perrinchief
John Corbet (MP for Bishop's Castle) (fl. 1640s), MP for Bishop's Castle (UK Parliament constituency)
John Corbet (1751–1817), MP for Shrewsbury

See also
John Corbett (disambiguation)